Elachyophtalma keiensis is a moth in the family Bombycidae. It was described by Walter Rothschild in 1920. It is found on Little Kai Island in Indonesia.

The wingspan is about 47 mm.

References

Bombycidae
Moths described in 1920